The 2022 season was Terengganu's 64th season. It is the club's 16th consecutive season in the top flight of Malaysian football, having been promoted from the Malaysia Premier League at the end of the 2005–06 season. The club also participated in the Malaysia FA Cup and Malaysia Cup.

Coaching staff

 Head coach: Nafuzi Zain
 Assistant head coach: Tengku Hazman
 Assistant coach: Hairuddin Omar
 Goalkeeping coach: Yazid Yassin
 Fitness coach: Efindy Salleh
 Physiotherapist: Zulkifli Mohd Zin

Players

First-team squad

Transfers in

Transfers out

Competitions

Malaysia Super League

Malaysia FA Cup

Malaysia Cup

Knockout stage

Terengganu won 9–3 on aggregate

Terengganu won 4–1 on aggregate

Terengganu loss 2–3 on aggregate

Squad statistics

Terengganu

Terengganu II

References

Terengganu FC seasons
Terengganu
Malaysian football club seasons by club